The Finnish Navy used several different types of motor torpedo boats during World War II. Four Soviet motor torpedo boats were captured and commissioned by the Finnish Navy during the World War II. One of these was of larger D-3 class while three others belonged to G-5 class.

Sisu-class motor torpedo boats

Isku-class motor torpedo boat

Syöksy-class motor torpedo boats

Hurja-class motor torpedo boats

Jymy-class motor torpedo boats

Taisto-class motor torpedo boats

Captured D3-class motor torpedo boat

Finnish ship of the class
Vasama

Vasama: Ex-TK 52 in Soviet service. She was a Soviet D 3 type motor torpedo boat. She was found sunk at Borstö in October 1941, having run aground in a storm. She probably had tried to escape the German attack on Hiiumaa and Saaremaa. She was used as a torpedo boat in 1943, and changed into a patrol boat in 1943. Returned to Soviet Union after the Continuation War.

Captured G-5-class motor torpedo boats

Finnish ships of the class
Vihuri
Viima
V-3

All G-5 class motor torpedo boats were returned to Soviet Union after the Continuation War.

Vihuri Also known as V 1 in Finnish service and ex-TK 141 in Soviet service. She was found abandoned at Koivisto in 1941, but she wasn't taken into use until 1943. The Soviet G-5 class motor torpedo boat released its torpedoes by dropping them from rails in the aft. The ship then had to steer away from the torpedoes path, a maneuver that could be quite tricky in the close waters of the Gulf of Finland. Vihuri participated in the attack on the harbour of Lavansaari on November 18, 1942, where Syöksy managed to torpedo the Soviet gunboat Krasnoye Znamya (1,760 tons), which sunk.
Viima Also known as V 2 in Finnish service, ex-TK 64 in Soviet service. The Viima was a Soviet G 5 type motor torpedo boat, built in aluminum. She was found abandoned at Koivisto in 1941, but she wasn't taken into use until 1943.
V 3 Ex-TK 51 in Soviet service. She was captured at the Bay of Vyborg in June 1944.

Forum Marinum